Vledder is a village in the Dutch province of Drenthe. It is a part of the municipality of Westerveld, and lies about 24 km northwest of Hoogeveen. It is located along the small river Vledder Aa.

History
Prehistoric settlements have been found in the area. Officially, the village of Vledder was started approximately in the year 500 AD. Situated in a desolate region, the village grew slowly. Around 900 AD seven farms were part of the community. In 1300 this number had risen to 20, at the end of the sixteenth century the farms numbered 29.

Vledder was a separate municipality between 1819 and 1998, when it became a part of Westerveld.

Attractions
The village contains a museum of fake art, a Seamuseum, a Nazi labour camp for Jewish people (Kamp Vledder) and a museum of contemporary prints and glass.

Gallery

References

External links
 

Municipalities of the Netherlands disestablished in 1998
Populated places in Drenthe
Former municipalities of Drenthe
Westerveld